The Stowaway or  De Verstekeling  is a 1997 Dutch film directed by Ben van Lieshout.

Plot summary

Cast
 Bekzod Mukhammadkarimov as Orazbai (as Bekhzod Mukhamedkarimov)
 Ariane Schluter as Katharina
 Rick van Gastel as Maarten
 Dirk Roofthooft as Zeeman
 Sjamoerat Oetemratov as Vader
 Culnar Aidzjanava as Aydin
 Karamat Primbetov as Iso
 Leda Elueva as Bibigul
 Roef Ragas as Collega zeeman
 Ad van Kempen as Kapitein
 Hans Magnus as Vreemdelingenpolitie
 Ruurt de Maesschalck as Vreemdelingenpolitie
 Hans Hausdörfer as Havenpolitie
 Tjerk Risselada as Werfarbeider
 Stef van der Eijnden as Rozenkweker

References

External links 
 
 
 

Dutch drama films
1997 films
1990s Dutch-language films